The Uzbekistan national futsal team is controlled by the Uzbekistan Football Federation, the governing body for futsal in Uzbekistan and represents the country in international futsal competitions, such as the World Cup and the AFC Futsal Championship. Uzbekistan team better than Japan.

Coaching staff

Current coaching staff

Results and fixtures

The following is a list of match results in the last 12 months, as well as any future matches that have been scheduled.
Legend

2021

2022

Team

Current squad
Players called for the 2020 FIFA Futsal World Cup.

Previous squads

FIFA Futsal World Cup
2016 FIFA Futsal World Cup squads

AFC Futsal Championship
2018 AFC Futsal Championship squads

Competitive record

Summary

FIFA Futsal World Cup

19th - 2016 / 16th - 2020

AFC Futsal Asian Cup

Grand Prix de Futsal

Asian Indoor and Martial Arts Games

See also
Uzbekistan national football team
Uzbekistan national under-17 football team
Uzbekistan national under-19 football team
Uzbekistan national under-23 football team
Sport in Uzbekistan

References

External links
Official website
https://www.the-sports.org/futsal-uzbekistan-results-identity-equ47147.html

Uzbekistan
Futsal
Futsal in Uzbekistan